Phil Penna (November 1857 – 5 January 1939) was an American labor leader, and president of the United Mine Workers of America (UMWA) from 1895 to 1896.

John McBride, president of UMWA, had won election as president of the American Federation of Labor in 1895, unseating Samuel Gompers.  McBride resigned to take the position, and Penna was elected his successor.

The continuing Long Depression severely depressed employment, wages and benefits for coal miners during his tenure.  McBride had led the Bituminous Coal Miners' Strike—an unsuccessful eight-week national coal miners' strike—the year before Penna's presidency, which encouraged hundreds of non-union mines to flood the market for coal.

During Penna's presidency, membership in the Mine Workers fell from 13,000 to 9,700, and the union's treasury dropped from $2,600 to $600.  Penna suspended union operations, stopped publishing the union newsletter and ceased paying per capita dues to the AFL. Penna did not run for re-election.  His successor was Michael Ratchford.

References
Coleman, McAlister. Men and Coal. New York: Farrar and Rinehart, 1943.
Fink, Gary M., ed. Biographical Dictionary of American Labor. Westport, Ct.: Greenwood Press, 1984. 

1857 births
1939 deaths
Presidents of the United Mine Workers
American trade unionists of English descent
Trade unionists from Indiana
Trade unionists from Cornwall
English emigrants to the United States